Polyptychus affinis is a moth of the family Sphingidae first described by Walter Rothschild and Karl Jordan in 1903.

The larvae feed on Detarium senegalense and Albizia species.

Taxonomy
Polyptychus retusus is sometimes treated as a valid species.

References

Polyptychus
Moths described in 1903
Moths of Africa